The 1986 FIA European Formula Three Cup was the second European Formula Three Cup race and the first to be held at the Autodromo Enzo e Dino Ferrari on October 26, 1986. The race was won by Italian Stefano Modena, driving for Euroteam outfit, who finished ahead of the previous years winner Alex Caffi and fellow Italian Nicola Larini.

Drivers and teams

Classification

Qualifying

Race

See also
 FIA European Formula Three Cup

References

FIA European Formula Three Cup
FIA European Formula Three Cup